The Year We Thought About Love is a 2015 feature-length documentary film about the LGBTQ theater group, True Colors: OUT Youth Theater, directed by Ellen Brodsky. As of December 2015, the film has been seen in 21 states and 6 countries with a DVD available to community groups, public libraries, community colleges, and colleges and universities.

Synopsis
The film focuses on a Boston-based group of LGBTQ youth of color band together and dare to be 'out' on stage about their lives and their loves. The cast of True Colors: OUT Youth Theater transforms their struggles into performance for social change. The film's cast members include a transgender teenager, Alyssa, who is kicked out of her home, a devout Christian, Chi, who challenges his church's homophobia, and a genderqueer individual, Ayden, who likes to wear masculine clothing, even as they model dresses on the runway. After the Boston Marathon bombs explode yards from their rehearsal space, the troupe becomes even more determined to share their stories of love to help their city heal.

Production notes
The Year We Thought About Love was filmed in Boston and premiered at the Santa Barbara International Film Festival on January 31, 2015.

Awards

2016 National Arts and Humanities Youth Program Award
True Colors: Out Youth Theater was one of the 12 winners of the 2016 National Arts and Humanities Youth Program Award and the first LGBTQ organization ever to receive this award. The group was invited to the White House on November 15, 2016, to receive the award from Michelle Obama.

External links

References

2015 films
2015 documentary films
American documentary films
American LGBT-related films
Films set in Boston
Documentary films about LGBT topics
LGBT culture in Boston
Documentary films about theatre
LGBT theatre in the United States
Theatre in Boston
2016 LGBT-related films
Documentary films about Massachusetts
2010s American films